Karl Josef Aigen (8 October 1684 – 22 October 1762) was a landscape painter, born at Olomouc.

Life

Aigen was born in Olomouc on 8 October 1685, the son of a goldsmith. He was a pupil of the Olomouc painter Dominik Maier. He lived in Vienna from about 1720, where he was professor of painting at the Academy from 1751 until his death. His work consists of landscapes with figures, genre paintings and altarpieces. His style shows the influence of artists from France and the Low Countries.

He died at Vienna on 21 October 1762.

The Gallery of the Belvedere in Vienna has two works by him, both scenes with figures.

References

External links

1684 births
1762 deaths
17th-century Austrian painters
18th-century Austrian painters
18th-century Austrian male artists
Academy of Fine Arts Vienna alumni
Academic staff of the Academy of Fine Arts Vienna
Austrian male painters
Moravian-German people
People from the Margraviate of Moravia
Artists from Olomouc